Mount Muir is a peak in the Sierra Nevada of California,  south of Mount Whitney.  This  peak is named in honor of Scottish-born John Muir, a famous geologist, conservationist and founder of the Sierra Club.  The southernmost section of the John Muir Trail contours along the west side of Mount Muir near its summit and ends on the summit of Mount Whitney.

Climbing
Among mountain climbers, a peak needs to meet certain criteria in order to be included in some lists. To be listed as an independent peak a summit must have  of clean prominence. A reliable source gives Mount Muir's clean prominence as 298feet, and so the peak does not qualify for lists of fourteeners based on elevation and prominence. It is included in other lists which do not depend on prominence. Some lists are based on more subjective criteria, and Mount Muir is included in the Sierra Peaks Section list, the Western States Climbers list, and the Vulgarian Ramblers 13,800-Footers of the Contiguous USA list.

The easiest approach is from the John Muir Trail just north of its junction with the Mount Whitney Trail in Sequoia National Park.  The trail passes very near the summit and the climb involves a short stretch of difficult scrambling and/or easy rock climbing up the steep western slope to the summit block,. A dayhike permit or a backcountry permit with a Whitney Zone stamp is required to hike the Mount Whitney Trail.

The route on this side (the north side of the east buttress) was first climbed on July 11, 1935, by Nelson P. Nies and John D. Mendenhall. It is a roped climb, (class 4). The south side of the east buttress, also class 4, was first climbed on September 1, 1935, by Arthur B. Johnson and William Rice.

See also

List of mountain peaks of California

References

Mountains of Sequoia National Park
Mountains of the John Muir Wilderness
Mountains of Inyo County, California
Mountains of Tulare County, California
Mountains of Northern California
North American 4000 m summits